The first USS Mauna Loa (SP-28) was an armed motorboat that served in the United States Navy as a patrol vessel from 1917 to 1918.

Mauna Loa was built in 1916 by George Lawley and Sons at Neponset, Massachusetts, as a private motorboat of the same name. The U.S. Navy acquired her from her owner, A. C. James, on a free lease contract on 10 May 1917 for World War I service. She was commissioned as USS Mauna Loa (SP-28) on 11 May 1917.

Mauna Loa was assigned to the 1st Naval District. She patrolled the coast of northern New England until the end of the war.

The Navy decommissioned Mauna Loa on 5 December 1918 and returned her to her owner the same day.

References

Department of the Navy: Naval Historical Center: Online Library of Selected Images: Civilian Ships: Mauna Loa (Motor Boat, 1916). Served as USS Mauna Loa (SP-28) in 1917-1918
NavSource Online: Section Patrol Craft Photo Archive Mauna Loa (SP 28)

Patrol vessels of the United States Navy
World War I patrol vessels of the United States
Ships built in Boston
1916 ships